Venezuela competed at the 1996 Summer Olympics in Atlanta, United States. 39 competitors, 34 men and 5 women, took part in 36 events in 12 sports.

Athletics

Key
Note–Ranks given for track events are within the athlete's heat only
Q = Qualified for the next round
q = Qualified for the next round as a fastest loser or, in field events, by position without achieving the qualifying target
NR = National record
N/A = Round not applicable for the event
Bye = Athlete not required to compete in round

Men
Track & road events

Field events

Boxing

Cycling

Road

Track

Points Race

Sprint

Diving

Men

Fencing

Four fencers, all men, represented Venezuela in 1996.

Men

Judo

Women

Sailing

Men

Swimming

Men

Table tennis

Tennis

Men

Weightlifting

Men

Wrestling

Men's Freestyle

Men's Greco-Roman

See also
 Venezuela at the 1995 Pan American Games

References

External links
 Official Olympic Reports

Nations at the 1996 Summer Olympics
1996 Summer Olympics
1996 in Venezuelan sport